Tazenakht is a village in Errachidia Province, in the Drâa-Tafilalet region in southeastern Morocco.

References

Populated places in Errachidia Province